Merton of the Movies is a 1924 American comedy film directed by James Cruze, written by Walter Woods, and starring Glenn Hunter and Viola Dana. It is based on the George S. Kaufman and Marc Connelly 1922 play of the same name, which in turn was based on Harry Leon Wilson's novel, also titled Merton of the Movies.

Glenn Hunter had originated the role of Merton Gill in the Broadway play and reprised his role in this film. Since the play had depended on funny dialogue, the movie (being silent) was opened up and a good deal of slapstick used instead. Thomas Hischak described the result as "uneven" although "Hunter still pleases and there are some droll performances by the supporting cast".

The film is now considered a lost film. It was remade in 1932 (as Make Me a Star) and again in 1947.

Plot
Merton is an aspiring movie actor. He is a terrible actor but when the movie executives see how funny his overacting is, they cast him in a comedy, but tell him that he's acting in a drama.

Cast

See also
List of lost films
Hollywood (1923), a film about movies also directed by James Cruze and also a lost film

References

External links

Viola Dana and Glenn Hunter

1924 films
1924 comedy films
American silent feature films
Silent American comedy films
American black-and-white films
Films about actors
Films about filmmaking
Films about Hollywood, Los Angeles
Films based on American novels
American films based on plays
Films directed by James Cruze
Lost American films
Paramount Pictures films
1924 lost films
Lost comedy films
1920s American films
1920s English-language films
English-language comedy films